Pro Arte Alphen Park is a semi-private art school English medium co-educational high school situated in the suburb of Menlopark in Pretoria in Gauteng province of South Africa. It also has boarding facilities, It is one of the top and most academic private schools in Pretoria

General information 

Located in Pretoria's eastern suburbs, Pro Arte Alphen Park is an English High School.

History 

The history of the school began in 1964, when a commercial, Afrikaans medium school was built in the suburb of Alphen Park across the Ashlea Gardens estate. The school was successful in attracting students who wanted to pursue a career in the financial services sector which was growing steadily at that time. The school accommodated over 800 students and operated for 30 years until 1994.

Concurrently, the Pretoria school of Art, music and ballet was operating on the grounds of Pretoria Boys High School which is now the Pollock campus of Boys High. The arrangement was temporary as it seems that the state was planning on financing the construction of a new art school in Pretoria with its own grounds and facilities.

By the 1980s, the state of South Africa had great economic pressures due to the political context of the time and as a result, there was a shortage of funds that could be utilized to construct a new arts school from fresh. A decision was taken by the Transvaal department of education to move the art school from Pollock campus to the grounds of the commercial school in Alphen Park. The process of integrating the two schools was completed by 1992 and by 1994, the school started operating as a new, fully integrated Pro Arte Alphen Park.

This school focused school of specialisation with attention paid to the arts and enterprise management.

Today, the school continues in its tradition of arts that it obtained from the Pretoria Art School alongside a tradition of enterprise management that it got from the commercial school. The school thus has six study fields including art, music, dance, drama alongside enterprise management and hospitality studies.

Subjects offered

Grades 8-and 9

Compulsory subjects 
English HL
Mathematics
Social Sciences
Natural Sciences
Technology
Afrikaans FAL
French SAL
Life Orientation
Economic and Management Sciences
Arts & Culture

Main Focus Area Subjects 
One of the following - All focus areas and acceptance at the school is subject to Auditions.  Auditions must be passed.
Drama
Arts
Music
Enterprise Management (Accounting as main subject)
Hospitality
Dance (Ballet, Jazz & Spanish)

Grades 10 to 12

Compulsory subjects 
English HL
Afrikaans FAL
Life Orientation
Mathematics OR Mathematical Literacy

Optional subjects 
Physical Sciences
Computer Applications Technology
Information Technology
Economics
Geography
Business Studies
Life Sciences (Biology)
French SAL
Tourism
Visual Arts
Dramatic Arts
Dance Studies
Hospitality Studies
Accounting
Music
Design
History

References 

1994 establishments in South Africa
Boarding schools in South Africa
Christianity in Pretoria
Bilingual schools in South Africa
Education in Pretoria
Educational institutions established in 1994
Schools in Gauteng